NHL Tonight (formerly NHL on the Fly: Final) is the flagship show on the NHL Network in Canada and the United States. The show made its debut under its current title in December 2011. It airs nightly at 10:00 pm throughout the NHL season carrying highlights from all of the day's games and includes live “look-ins” of any west coast games still in progress. 
 
The show airs immediately after NHL on the Fly, the network's in-game studio show with live “look-ins” of all current games, and was previously entitled NHL on the Fly: Final. It used to last either 30 or 60 minutes depending on the number of games that night, but in its current incarnation, the show is an hour long, no matter how many games are played that evening. It should not be confused with ESPN's National Hockey Night which ended after the 2003-2004 NHL season.

The show was formerly simulcast occasionally on TSN for the national audience when the channel aired regional Toronto Maple Leafs action in Ontario. TSN no longer airs regional-only games of this nature.

As of the beginning of the 2007–08 NHL season, the NHL Network is now available in the United States.

Personalities

Current

Hosts
Andi Petrillo
Kathryn Tappen
Jamie Hersch
Mark Roe
Glenn Schiiler

Analysts
Craig Button
Dave Reid
Kevin Weekes
EJ Hradek
Jamie McLennan
Jamal Mayers

Former 
Kay Whitmore
Bob McGill
Todd Lewis
Lauren Veltman
Mike Johnson
Jay Onrait

External links 
 NHL Network shows
 

The Sports Network original programming
National Hockey League on television
2010s Canadian sports television series